Hwang Jun-ho may refer to:
 Hwang Jun-ho (skier)
 Hwang Jun-ho (footballer)
 Hwang Jun-ho (character), a Squid Game character